Pope Timothy II of Alexandria (died 477), also known as Timothy Ailuros (from Greek Αἴλουρος, "cat," because of his small build or in this case probably "weasel"), succeeded twice in supplanting the Chalcedonian patriarch of Alexandria.

Before he became a bishop, Timothy was a monk at the Eikoston. He was elected and consecrated after the death of the exiled Dioscorus of Alexandria in 454 by the Miaphysite opponents of the Council of Chalcedon and became a rival of the pro-Chalcedon bishop Proterius.

According to pro-Chalcedon sources, after Proterius of Alexandria,  has been installed as patriarch after the Council of Chalcedon, he was murdered at Timothy's instigation at the baptistery during Easter. In the Anti-Chalcedon Sources, Proterius was murdered on the order of the Byzantine General in Charge of Egypt after a heated exchange 

In 460, Emperor Leo I expelled him from Alexandria and installed the Chalcedonian Timothy III Salophakiolos as patriarch.

In 475 Timothy was brought back to Alexandria by Basiliscus, where he ruled as patriarch until his death. According to John of Nikiu, the emperor Zeno sent an officer to summon him, but when the officer arrived, Timothy told him “The emperor will not see my face” and immediately fell ill and died.

References

Sources
 
 
 

Timothy II Aelurus of Alexandria
5th-century Popes and Patriarchs of Alexandria
Year of birth unknown